Mārtiņš Grundmanis (18 November 1913 – 30 November 1944) was a Latvian basketball player. Grundmanis won a gold medal at the 1935 EuroBasket competition, becoming the first European champion. He also participated at the 1936 Summer Olympics and at the 1937 EuroBasket.

Career
In the first half of the 1930s Grundmanis played for the JKS (Latvian Christian Youth) team. He was also a member of the Latvian Christian Youth Society, and graduated from a four-year physical education program at the University of Tartu. In late 1930s Grundmanis played for the military team Rīgas ASK, and became a two time Latvian champion (1939-1940).

Overall Grundmanis played 20 games for the Latvian national basketball team. During Nazi occupation of Latvia during World War II, Grundmanis was conscripted into Latvian Legion. He was taken prisoner of war by Soviet Red Army in 1944. He committed suicide on 30 November 1944 at the German POW camp in Sarkandaugava, Riga.

References 

1913 births
1944 suicides
Olympic basketball players of Latvia
Basketball players at the 1936 Summer Olympics
Latvian men's basketball players
Latvian Waffen-SS personnel
Latvian military personnel killed in World War II
German military personnel who committed suicide
Latvian prisoners of war
World War II prisoners of war held by the Soviet Union
Prisoners who died in Soviet detention
Nazis who committed suicide in prison custody